Alice Cooper is the stage name of musician Vincent Furnier.

Alice Cooper may also refer to:
Alice Cooper (band), the rock band fronted by Furnier
Alice Cooper (teacher) (1846-1917), a British headmistress
Alice Cooper (rugby union), English rugby union player
Alice Cooper (sculptor) (1875-1937), an American sculptor
Alice Cooper, a character on the television show Mayberry R.F.D. portrayed by Alice Ghostley
Alice Cooper (Archie Comics) 
Alice Cooper, a character on the television show Riverdale portrayed by Mädchen Amick